Claes Roxbergh (born 4 October 1945) is a Swedish Green Party politician, member of the Riksdag 1988–1991, 1994 and finally 2002–2006.

References

1945 births
Living people
Members of the Riksdag 1988–1991
Members of the Riksdag 1994–1998
Members of the Riksdag 2002–2006
Members of the Riksdag from the Green Party
Place of birth missing (living people)